Bruno Miguel Costa Monteiro Tavares (born 16 April 2002) is a Portuguese professional footballer who plays as a winger for Cypriot First Division club Pafos.

Club career
Tavares is a youth academy graduate of Sporting CP. On 31 August 2021, he joined Varzim on a season long loan deal. He made his professional debut for the club on 22 October 2021 in a 1–0 league defeat against Académico Viseu.

On 4 July 2022, Tavares joined Cypriot First Division club Pafos.

International career
Tavares is a Portuguese youth international. He was part of squad which reached quarter-finals of 2019 UEFA European Under-17 Championship.

Career statistics

Club

References

External links
 
 
 

2002 births
Living people
Footballers from Lisbon
Association football forwards
Portuguese footballers
Portugal youth international footballers
Liga Portugal 2 players
Varzim S.C. players
Pafos FC players
Portuguese expatriate footballers
Portuguese expatriate sportspeople in Cyprus
Expatriate footballers in Cyprus